Dast Jerdeh (also Romanized as Dastjerdeh; also known as Dastgīrdah and Dastgirdakh) is a village in Dast Jerdeh Rural District of Chavarzaq District of Tarom County, Zanjan province, Iran. At the 2006 National Census, its population was 912 in 245 households. The following census in 2011 counted 1,014 people in 324 households. The latest census in 2016 showed a population of 1,169 people in 386 households; it was the largest village in its rural district.

References 

Tarom County

Populated places in Zanjan Province

Populated places in Tarom County